David Ngoombujarra (27 June 1967 – 17 July 2011) was an Indigenous Australian actor of the Yamatji people. Born David Bernard Starr in Meekatharra, Western Australia, his acting career spanned over two decades from the 1980s to 2010; he won three Australian Film Institute Awards. On 17 July 2011 he was found in a park in Fremantle, and taken to Fremantle Hospital where he was pronounced dead.

Personal life 
Ngoombujarra was adopted by Amy and Derek Sloan, and met his birth mother when he was 14. He moved to Sydney with plans for stardom and picked up some minor film roles in Young Einstein and others after being spotted busking in Circular Quay. His wide smile and booming laugh were very marketable. Ngoombujarra fell into petty crime and battled alcohol addiction which may have contributed to his death.

It was revealed that Ngoombujara fathered a daughter who was later adopted by his cousin, actor Ernie Dingo.

Filmography

Awards 
 AFI Best Supporting Actor in Television Drama for The Circuit (2007)
 AFI Best Actor in a Supporting Role for Black and White (2002)
 AFI Best Actor in a Supporting Role for Day of the Dog (1993)

References

External links 

1967 births
2011 deaths
AACTA Award winners
Australian male film actors
Indigenous Australian male actors
People from Meekatharra, Western Australia